The  is a railway line in Japan. Part of the East Japan Railway Company (JR East) system, it connects Kitakami Station in Kitakami, Iwate Prefecture to Yokote Station in Yokote, Akita Prefecture, acting as a connecting line between the Ōu Main Line to the Tōhoku Main Line.  It connects with the Tōhoku Shinkansen and Tohoku Main Line at Kitakami Station, and the Ōu Main Line at Yokote Station.

History
The line opened in sections from both Kitakami and Yokote between 1920 and 1924.

In 1962 a  deviation was built in conjunction with the construction of the Yuda Dam, which added  to the length of the line.

CTC signalling was commissioned in 1994, and freight services ceased in 2010.

Station list
● - All trains stop
｜ - All trains pass

Rolling stock

 KiHa 100 series DMUs

References

This article incorporates material from the corresponding article in the Japanese Wikipedia

External links

 
 Lines of East Japan Railway Company
 Rail transport in Akita Prefecture
 Rail transport in Iwate Prefecture
1067 mm gauge railways in Japan